Deion Luwynn Sanders Sr. (born August 9, 1967) is an American football coach and former player who is the head coach of the Colorado Buffaloes of the Pac-12 Conference and former coach of Jackson State Tigers of the SWAC. Nicknamed "Neon Deion", "Prime Time" and "Coach Prime", he played for 14 seasons as a cornerback in the National Football League (NFL) with the Atlanta Falcons, San Francisco 49ers, Dallas Cowboys, Washington Redskins, and Baltimore Ravens. Sanders was also a baseball outfielder for nine seasons in Major League Baseball (MLB) with the New York Yankees, Atlanta Braves, Cincinnati Reds, and San Francisco Giants. He won two Super Bowl titles and made a World Series appearance in 1992, making him the only athlete to play in both a Super Bowl and a World Series.
Sanders is widely regarded as the greatest cornerback in NFL history.

Sanders played college football for the  Florida State Seminoles, winning the Jim Thorpe Award as a senior. He was selected by the Falcons fifth overall in the 1989 NFL Draft and played football primarily at cornerback, while also making appearances as kickoff returner, punt returner, and wide receiver. During his career, he was named to eight Pro Bowls, received six first-team All-Pros, and made consecutive Super Bowl appearances in Super Bowl XXIX with the 49ers and Super Bowl XXX with the Cowboys, winning both. He was inducted into the Pro Football Hall of Fame and the College Football Hall of Fame in 2011.

After retiring as a player, Sanders pursued a sports analyst and coaching career. He served as the head football coach for the Jackson State Tigers from 2020 to 2022, leading the team to two consecutive Celebration Bowl appearances and the first undefeated regular season in school history. Near the end of the 2022 season, Sanders was named the head football coach at Colorado.

Early life
Sanders was born in Fort Myers, Florida, to Connie Sanders and Mims Sanders. His parents divorced when Sanders was two years old. Sanders was raised by his mother and her new husband, Willie Knight, whom Sanders credits with being influential in his life. He attended North Fort Myers High School, and was a letterman and All-State honoree in football, basketball and baseball. In 1985, Sanders was named to the Florida High School Association All-Century Team which selected the top 33 players in the 100-year history of high school football in the state.

The Kansas City Royals selected Sanders out of North Fort Myers High School in the sixth round of the 1985 Major League Baseball draft. However, he did not sign with the Royals.

College career

Sanders enrolled at Florida State University and played three sports for the Florida State Seminoles: football, baseball, and track. Beginning in his freshman year, he started in the Seminoles' secondary, played outfield for the baseball team that finished fifth in the nation, and helped lead the track and field team to a conference championship.

Under head coach Bobby Bowden, Sanders was a two-time consensus All-American cornerback in 1987 and 1988, and a third-team All-American in 1986, intercepting 14 passes in his career, including three in bowl games, and managed to return one interception 100 yards for a touchdown, breaking Fred Biletnikoff's interception return record by one yard. He won the Jim Thorpe Award in 1988. He was also a standout punt returner for Florida State, leading the nation in 1988 with his punt return average, and breaking the school's record for career punt return yards. Sanders made an interception with five seconds left to seal Florida State's 13–7 win over Auburn in the 1989 Sugar Bowl during the 1988 postseason. Based on those accolades, his No. 2 jersey at Florida State was retired in 1995. He finished his career with 126 punt returns for 1,429 yards and three touchdowns, as well as 14 interceptions, returning them for 287 yards and three scores. At the time of his graduation, Sanders' 14 interceptions was the second highest total in school history. Bowden would later state that Sanders was his "measuring stick for athletic ability".

While playing baseball under head coach Mike Martin at Florida State, Sanders' batting average was .331 in 1986. He also compiled 27 stolen bases in 1987.

On May 16, 1987 (while the Metro Conference baseball and track championships were being played simultaneously in Columbia, South Carolina), Sanders played in the conference semifinal baseball game against Southern Mississippi, ran a leg of a 4 × 100 relay, then returned to play in the baseball championship game against Cincinnati. Though Sanders' relay team did not place in the event, the FSU track team was the overall conference champion, and the baseball team won the conference title as well.

Professional baseball career

Drafts and minor leagues
Sanders had a nine-year, part-time baseball career, playing left and center field in 641 games with four teams. He was originally drafted by the Kansas City Royals in the sixth round of the 1985 draft, but did not sign with them. The New York Yankees selected Sanders in the 30th round of the 1988 Major League Baseball draft, and he signed with the team on June 22. He batted .284 in 28 minor league games after signing.

The Yankees invited Sanders to spring training in 1989. Assigned to wear No. 71 as a uniform number, Sanders requested a single digit number. The Yankees gave him No. 30, the lowest number available, which offended many veteran players on the team. Sanders opened the 1989 season with the Albany-Colonie Yankees of the Class AA Eastern League. Though Sanders planned to leave the Yankees in July to attend NFL training camp, he became embroiled in a contract dispute with the Falcons, and used the Yankees as leverage.

New York Yankees (1989–1990)
He received a promotion to the major leagues, and spent the summer with the Columbus Clippers of the Class AAA International League. Sanders made his MLB debut on May 31, 1989.

During the 1989 season, he hit a major league home run and scored a touchdown in the NFL in the same week, becoming the only player ever to do so. Sanders is also the only man to play in both a Super Bowl and a World Series. Sanders and Bo Jackson were the preeminent multi-sport athletes of their time, but prior to the 1990 season, they had never squared off against each other in a professional game. That changed in 1990, when Jackson and Sanders met five times on the diamond—the most memorable of which came on July 17, in what was billed as "The Bo and Prime Time Show". After Bo Jackson's three-homer night, Sanders said, "He's (Bo's) one of the best athletes who ever put on a uniform."

Sanders made the Yankees' Opening Day roster for the 1990 season. On May 22, 1990, Sanders became involved in a dispute with Chicago White Sox catcher Carlton Fisk. Sanders started by stepping up to the plate with one out and a runner on third, drawing a dollar sign in the dirt before the pitch and then failed to run to first base after hitting a routine pop fly to shortstop, trotting back to the dugout instead. The Yankee fans booed, and Fisk told Sanders to run the ball out and called Sanders a "piece of shit". Later in the game, Sanders told Fisk that "the days of slavery are over". Fisk was furious. "He comes up and wants to make it a racial issue, there's no racial issue involved. There is a right way and a wrong way to play this game."

By mid-July, Sanders expressed that he was unsure if he would remain with the Yankees or report to training camp for the upcoming NFL season. He requested a $1 million salary for the 1991 season, and the Yankees ended negotiations on a contract extension with Sanders. He left the team, finishing the 1990 season with a .158 batting average and three home runs in 57 games. In September 1990, the Yankees placed Sanders on waivers with the intention of giving him his release, as Yankees' general manager Gene Michael said that Sanders' football career was stunting his baseball development.

Atlanta Braves (1991–1994)
Sanders later signed with the Atlanta Braves for the 1991 MLB season. On July 31, Sanders hit a key three-run homer to spark a comeback win against the Pittsburgh Pirates during the Braves' run to the National League West Division title. However, he had to leave the Braves the very next day to report to the Atlanta Falcons because of a clause in his NFL contract and missed the postseason. Before the 1992 season, Sanders reworked his NFL deal, whereby he still reported to the Falcons for training camp in August, but was allowed to rejoin the Braves for the postseason.

During the 1992 season, his best year in the majors, Sanders hit .304 for the team, stole 26 bases, and led the NL with 14 triples in 97 games. In four games of the 1992 World Series, Sanders batted .533 with four runs, eight hits, two doubles, and one RBI while playing with a broken bone in his foot. His batting average, on-base percentage, slugging percentage, total bases and win probability added each led the team in the series. Despite Sanders' performance, the Braves ultimately lost to the Toronto Blue Jays in six games. In Game 3, he narrowly avoided being a victim of what would have been only the second triple play in World Series history (following Bill Wambsganss' unassisted triple play in 1920). With Sanders on second base and Terry Pendleton on first, David Justice hit a deep fly ball to center field that Blue Jays center fielder Devon White unexpectedly caught with a leaping effort. Pendleton passed Sanders on the bases for the second out, but umpire Bob Davidson called Sanders safe after he scampered back to second base. Replays showed that Toronto third baseman Kelly Gruber tagged him on the heel before he returned to second.

Cincinnati Reds (1994–1995) 
The Braves traded Sanders to the Cincinnati Reds in exchange for Roberto Kelly on May 30, 1994. In 46 games played, Sanders batted .277 and stole 19 bases. The following year, he played in 33 games for the Reds, recording a .240 batting average with 16 stolen bases before being traded to the San Francisco Giants.

San Francisco Giants (1995) 
Sanders was sent to the San Francisco Giants in an eight-player trade on July 21, 1995. He batted .280, hit 5 home runs and stole 8 bases in 52 games for the Giants.

Cincinnati Reds (1997, 2001)
In 1997, Sanders finished second in the NL with 56 stolen bases in 115 games while with the Cincinnati Reds before leaving baseball for three years.

Sanders returned to the Reds in 2001, but was released after playing in only 29 games and batting just .173.

Toronto Blue Jays
After his release from the Reds, he signed a minor league contract with the Toronto Blue Jays. Sanders was hitting .252 for the Syracuse SkyChiefs before the Washington Redskins found a loophole in his contract which compelled him to return to the Redskins. Sanders' football contract had been negotiated to allow for him to play both baseball and football, but the terms of the contract stated that Sanders could miss NFL training camp and the first few games of the season only if he were playing Major League Baseball. Since he was not then on an MLB roster, Sanders had to leave Syracuse and return to the Redskins so he would not violate his NFL contract. But before arriving at training camp, Sanders informed Redskins personnel he was retiring from professional baseball. In his final professional baseball game, Sanders hit a solo home run and an RBI single in Syracuse's 12–6 win over the Toledo Mud Hens. As those in MLB and the NFL urged Sanders to concentrate on only one sport (similar to what they did with Bo Jackson), he often explained, "football is my wife and baseball is my mistress."

Professional football career

Draft and Atlanta Falcons
At the 1989 NFL Scouting Combine, Sanders ran a 4.20 and 4.29 second 40-yard dash. He was the fifth pick overall in the 1989 NFL Draft by the Atlanta Falcons, where he played until 1993. Despite fumbling (and recovering) his first NFL punt return (which was re-kicked on a penalty), Sanders ran for a touchdown on his second attempt of his first game. During his time in Atlanta, he intercepted 24 passes (including a career-high seven in 1993), three of which he returned for touchdowns. In 1992, he also led the league in kickoff return yards (1,067), yards per return (26.7) and return touchdowns (two). On October 11, 1992, Sanders played in a Falcons game in Miami and then flew to Pittsburgh, hoping to play in the Braves' League Championship Series game against the Pirates that evening and become the first athlete to play in two professional leagues in the same day. Sanders, however did not appear in the baseball game that night. During his five years playing with the Falcons, Sanders scored 10 touchdowns (three defensive, three kick returns, two punt returns, and two receptions). He is the only Pro Football Hall of Fame inductee from his draft's top five picks to not spend his entire career with the team that selected him.

San Francisco 49ers
After five seasons with Atlanta, Sanders signed on to play the 1994 season with the San Francisco 49ers. He arguably had his best season as a professional football player, recording six interceptions and returning them for an NFL-best 303 yards and three touchdowns, as well as an astounding (and never equaled) average of 50.5 yards per return. (Average yards-per-interception return in not an official NFL statistic however.) It was also the most interception-return-yardage in a single-season since Charlie McNeil in 1961. Two of his interceptions were returned for a gain of at least 90 yards, making him the first player to do this in NFL history. On October 16, 1994, Sanders made his dramatic return to the Georgia Dome in a 49er uniform. After getting into a scuffle with his former Falcon teammate Andre Rison, Sanders intercepted a pass from quarterback Jeff George and returned it 93 yards while mockingly staring down the entire Falcons sideline before high-stepping into the end zone. Sanders was later voted the 1994 NFL Defensive Player of the Year. In Super Bowl XXIX, he recorded an end zone interception in the fourth quarter as the 49ers won over the San Diego Chargers, earning him his first championship ring.

Dallas Cowboys
Despite a successful season, Sanders left because the 49ers “weren’t interested in his services.”

Sanders, along with his agent Eugene Parker, courted several teams in need of a cornerback. The teams in the "Deion Sweepstakes", as it was called by the media, were the Philadelphia Eagles, Oakland Raiders, Miami Dolphins, New Orleans Saints, San Francisco 49ers and the Dallas Cowboys, who had lost their starting cornerback Kevin Smith to injury for the rest of the season.

On September 9, 1995, (in Week 2 of the season), Sanders signed a lucrative contract with the Dallas Cowboys (seven years, $35 million with a $12.999 million signing bonus, because owner Jerry Jones was superstitious about the number 13), essentially making him at the time, the highest-paid defensive player in the NFL. Sanders later stated in his book Power, Money & Sex: How Success Almost Ruined My Life that the Oakland Raiders offered him more money than any other team, but he chose to play in Dallas for more time on the offensive side of the ball, a chance to win back-to-back Super Bowls, and because of his friendship with Cowboys wide receiver Michael Irvin. Arthroscopic surgery kept him sidelined until his debut in Week 9, which was once again in Atlanta against the Falcons; the Cowboys won, 28–13. He went on to help the Cowboys win their third title in four years in Super Bowl XXX against the Pittsburgh Steelers, where he returned a punt for 11 yards and caught a 47-yard reception on offense, setting up Dallas's first touchdown of the game and a 27–17 victory. Sanders played four more seasons with Dallas, earning Pro Bowl selection in all of them. On June 2, 2000, he was released in a salary-cap move.

Washington Redskins
Soon after the Cowboys released Sanders, the Washington Redskins signed Sanders to a seven-year, $56 million contract. At the end of the 2000 season and an above-average statistical year, Sanders abruptly retired in July 2001 after only playing one year with the Redskins.

On December 23, 2002, the Redskins waived Sanders from the reserve/retired list in order to potentially allow him to play for the Oakland Raiders in the 2002–03 NFL playoffs. If he had passed through waivers unclaimed, he would have been able to sign a free-agent contract with any team and play during the season. However, on December 25, five teams (the Indianapolis Colts, Kansas City Chiefs, Pittsburgh Steelers, San Diego Chargers and Tennessee Titans) placed waiver bids for him, with the Chargers claiming him by having the highest waiver priority. Since it was too late in the season to be activated from the reserve/retired list, he was unable to play for the Chargers for the rest of the season.

Baltimore Ravens

In 2004, Sanders announced his intention to come out of retirement after being convinced by his friend Joe Zorovich, Baltimore Ravens cornerback Corey Fuller, and linebacker Ray Lewis to play. He signed a one-year deal with the Ravens to be a nickelback. Sanders chose to wear the number 37, which matched his age at the time, to preemptively let people know that he was well aware of his relative senior status as an NFL player (additionally, the number 21, used by Sanders throughout his career, was already being worn by Ravens Pro Bowl cornerback Chris McAlister). Against the Buffalo Bills in Week 7 of 2004, Sanders scored his ninth career interception return touchdown, moving him into a tie with Ken Houston and Aeneas Williams, and behind Rod Woodson (with 12), for second place all-time in the statistical category.

Sanders played in every game of the 2005 season. The Ravens failed to qualify for the postseason for the second straight year and he retired in January 2006.

NFL career statistics

Defensive/Special team statistics

Offensive statistics

Coaching career

High school
While continuing to work as an NFL analyst, Sanders became the head coach for the Prime Prep Academy which he co-founded. He stayed as the head coach for 2012 and 2013. In 2015, he was hired as the head coach for Triple A Academy where he was the coach for two seasons. In 2017, he became the offensive coordinator for Trinity Christian High School giving him the opportunity to coach his sons Shilo and Shedeur.

Jackson State
On September 21, 2020, Deion Sanders became the 21st head coach of the Jackson State Tigers, a team in the second level of NCAA football, the Division I Football Championship Subdivision (FCS), that represents the historically black (HBCU) Jackson State University.

In his first season in spring 2021, abbreviated and delayed from its normally intended fall 2020 schedule due to COVID-19 disruptions, he led the Tigers to a 4–3 record, with one win by forfeit. In the fall 2021 season, Sanders led the Tigers to the Southwestern Athletic Conference (SWAC) title and a program record of 11 wins, also being named the recipient of the fall 2021 Eddie Robinson Award as the season's top FCS head coach.

Sanders notably flipped the recruitment of defensive back Travis Hunter who was the number one overall recruit in the 2022 class. Hunter initially committed to Sanders' alma mater Florida State. The move was heralded by recruiting director Steve Wiltfong; he said it was "the biggest signing day moment in the history of college football" as Football Championship Subdivision programs and the HBCUs that compete at such a level of competition are not usual destinations for high level recruits out of high school. Hunter was the first five star recruit to sign with an FCS program.

Sanders led Jackson State to a 27−6 record during his three seasons at the helm.

Colorado
On December 3, 2022, Sanders was named the head coach of the Colorado Buffaloes.

Head coaching record

Legacy and honors
During his 14-year NFL career, Sanders was a perennial All-Pro and one of the strongest pass defenders ever to play the game.

Sanders also occasionally lined up with the team's offense. During the 1996 season, Sanders skipped the baseball season, concentrating on football, and attended the first NFL training camp of his career to better familiarize himself with the nuances of the wide receiver position. He became only the second two-way starter (after the Cardinals' Roy Green) in the NFL since Chuck Bednarik.

Sanders is the only man to play in both a Super Bowl and a World Series, to hit an MLB home run and score an NFL touchdown in the same week, and to have both a reception and an interception in the Super Bowl. He is one of seven players to win back-to-back Super Bowls with different teams. He is also one of two players to score an NFL touchdown six different ways (interception return, punt return, kickoff return, receiving, rushing, and fumble recovery).

During his career, Sanders intercepted 53 passes for 1,331 yards (a 25.1 yards per return average), recovered four fumbles for 15 yards, returned 155 kickoffs for 3,523 yards, gained 2,199 yards on 212 punt returns, and caught 60 passes for 784 yards. Sanders amassed 7,838 all-purpose yards and scored 22 touchdowns, nine interception returns, six punt returns, three kickoff returns, three receiving, and one fumble recovery. His 19 defensive and return touchdowns was an NFL record (now held by Devin Hester with 20 return touchdowns). In the postseason Sanders added five more interceptions, as well as three receptions for 95 yards, four carries for 39 yards, and two touchdowns (one rushing and one receiving). He was selected to eight Pro Bowls and won the NFL Defensive Player of the Year Award in 1994.

 College Football News named Sanders No. 8 in its list of 100 Greatest College Football Players of All-Time.
 The Sporting News named Sanders No. 37 in their Top 100 Football Players of the Century released in 1999.
 ESPN named Sanders No. 74 in its list of the 100 Great Athletes of the Century released in 1999.
 NFL.com named Sanders No. 34 on NFL's Top 100 list released in late 2010
 NFL Network named "Deion Sanders and anyone" in their Top 10 greatest cornerback tandems in NFL history: "...Deion Sanders started opposite 13 other cornerbacks, and no matter who started on the other side the defense was better with No. 21 baiting QBs." 
 On November 11, 2010, Sanders was inducted into the Atlanta Falcons' Ring of Honor.
 On May 17, 2011, Sanders was announced as a College Football Hall of Fame inductee.
 On August 6, 2011, Sanders was inducted into the Pro Football Hall of Fame in his first year of eligibility.

On February 6, 2011, at Super Bowl XLV in Arlington, Texas, Sanders performed the pre-game coin toss.

Sanders did not attend classes or take final exams during the fall semester of his senior year at Florida State, yet played in the Sugar Bowl against Auburn. This caused the Florida State Legislature to create the "Deion Sanders rule", whereby a football athlete at any state university could not play in a bowl game if he failed to successfully complete the previous semester.

In 1995, he signed with the Dallas Cowboys for a minimum yearly base salary and a nearly $13 million signing bonus in an attempt to circumvent the NFL's salary cap. This caused the NFL to institute its own "Deion Sanders rule" whereby a prorated portion of a player's signing bonus counted against the salary cap.

Media appearances and pop culture fame 
Sanders became known for sporting a "do-rag" or bandana and for high-stepping into the end zone followed by his touchdown dance celebrations. 
At the end of his Hall of Fame speech, he put a bandana on his bust.

His "Prime Time" nickname was given to him by a friend and high-school teammate, Florida Gators defensive back Richard Fain. The two played pickup basketball games together during the prime time television hour, and Sanders' athletic display during those games earned him the nickname. His other nicknames are "Lil Nicky" (for comparing himself with NCAA coaching great Nick Saban) and "Neon Deion".

Sanders, known for his custom-made showy suits and flashy jewelry, frequently capitalized on his image. On December 26, 1994, Sanders released Prime Time, a rap album on MC Hammer's Bust It Records that featured the singles "Must Be the Money" and "Prime Time Keeps on Tickin'". The album and singles didn't chart in the Top 40. Following his first Super Bowl victory with the San Francisco 49ers, Sanders hosted Saturday Night Live, broadcast on February 18, 1995. Sanders performed a medley of songs from Prime Time, including "Must Be the Money" and "Heidi Heidi Hey".

As Hammer's friend, Sanders appeared in the "2 Legit 2 Quit" music video, and his alter-ego "Prime Time" showed up in Hammer's "Pumps and a Bump" music video. Hammer being a big sports fan, launched a new enterprise during his career called Roll Wit It Entertainment & Sports Management which boasted such clients as Evander Holyfield, Deion Sanders and Reggie Brooks. In 1995, Hammer released "Straight to My Feet" with Sanders, from the Street Fighter soundtrack (released in December 1994). The song charted No. 57 in the UK.

In January 1995, Sanders became the official spokesman of the Sega Sports line of video games. Sanders has also appeared in television commercials for such companies as Nike, Pepsi, Burger King, Pizza Hut and American Express. These included a Road Runner Pepsi ad, with Sanders as the Road Runner with Wile E. Coyote targeting him, and a Pizza Hut commercial in which he appeared with Dallas Cowboys owner Jerry Jones. He also makes a cameo as himself in the film Celtic Pride.

After retiring from the NFL in 2001, Sanders worked as a pre-game commentator for CBS' The NFL Today until 2004, when contract negotiations failed. Sanders turned down a 30% salary increase demanding to be paid $2.5 million, the highest of any NFL TV analyst. He was replaced by Shannon Sharpe. During Sanders' run, he participated in several sketches. The first was "Primetime and 21st", a mock street corner where Sanders (not yet a regular panelist) would give his opinions. Another one was his "Sanders Claus" persona, one of numerous sketches that involved young kids in football jerseys, representing NFL players, receiving a sarcastic gift from Sanders. Sanders actually debuted as "Sanders Claus" in a set of Nike commercials.

Sanders frequently made guest appearances on ESPN, especially on the ESPN Radio Dallas affiliate, and briefly hosted a show called The New American Sportsman. He also hosted the 2002 Miss USA pageant.

Sanders also was co-host of the 2004 GMA Dove Awards broadcast, taped in late April 2004, and slated for air on UPN in May 2004. When negotiations with fellow Viacom property CBS failed (see above) two weeks before the broadcast, and he signed a deal with ESPN, UPN promptly canceled the broadcast, and the show aired on the i Network in December 2004 (both UPN and CBS are now owned by CBS Corporation).

Sanders works at NFL Network as an analyst on a number of the network's shows. Prior to the Sunday night game, Sanders, alongside host Rich Eisen and Steve Mariucci, breaks down all the action from the afternoon games on NFL GameDay. At the conclusion of all the action on Sunday, Sanders, Mariucci, Michael Irvin and host Fran Charles recap the day's action with highlights, analysis and postgame interviews. For the 2010 season, Sanders joined Eisen, Mariucci and Marshall Faulk on the road for Thursday Night Kickoff presented by Lexus, NFL Network's two-hour pregame show leading into Thursday Night Football. The group broadcasts live from the stadium two hours prior to all eight live Thursday Night Football games and returns for the Sprint halftime show and Kay Jewelers postgame show. Sanders also has a segment called "Let's Go Primetime" on NFL Network.

In 2008, Sanders and his wife starred in the reality show Deion & Pilar: Prime Time Love, centering on them and their five children living in the small town of Prosper, Texas. That same year, he appeared with his family on Celebrity Family Feud in the July 22, 2008, episode, competing against Bruce and Kris Jenner, Kim, Kourtney and Khloé Kardashian.

Sanders appeared as himself in the fourth season of The League, playing a prospective buyer of Andre's apartment.

In 2014, Sanders was featured in an episode of Running Wild with Bear Grylls, where he and Grylls hiked in the desert of southern Utah for two days, rappelling down canyon walls and later climbing up a mesa.

Sanders served as an alumni captain for Team Sanders in the 2014 Pro Bowl. He also re-joined CBS Sports as a studio analyst for Thursday games only. He still works for the NFL Network on Sundays.

In 2015, he competed against singer Justin Bieber in an episode of Spike's Lip Sync Battle and won with performances of "Play That Funky Music" by Wild Cherry and "Like a Virgin" by Madonna.

Sanders and his girlfriend Tracey Edmonds were featured together on an episode of Tiny House Nation that first aired on January 21, 2017.

In 2018, Sanders appeared in disguise on Undercover Boss; he met with youth coaches and the less fortunate; it aired on CBS.

Sanders is featured in the docuseries Coach Prime, which follows his career as a college football head coach.

Leon Sandcastle 
Leon Sandcastle is a fictional character, depicted as a disguise for Sanders. The Sandcastle character was created for an NFL Network commercial. Sandcastle first appeared in a Super Bowl commercial in 2013. The commercial depicted Sanders suggesting he could still play at a level higher than the rookies in the 2013 NFL Draft and deciding to make a comeback. He dons an afro, assumes the impromptu alias "Leon Sandcastle" and enters the draft, going through the full NFL Scouting Combine. For action shots, Ball State cornerback Andre Dawson served as the stunt double. The commercial features Sandcastle being drafted 1st overall in the draft by the Kansas City Chiefs. A voiceover then instructs viewers to watch NFL Network for offseason and draft coverage at the end noting in a deadpan voice that "the next rookie sensation probably won't be Leon Sandcastle."

Despite not being an actual prospect for the 2013 NFL Draft, several combine videos have been created. The most prominent of these videos is Sandcastle's "4.2 40 yard dash". The NFL also created a "Combine Profile" for Sandcastle, as they do with actual prospects. In Rich Eisen's 2013 annual 'Run Rich Run' event, Sandcastle appeared giving tips to Eisen. Sandcastle's combine profile reveals that Sandcastle attended Primetime University. The commercial had a positive social media response as "Leon Sandcastle" was trending on Twitter worldwide, shortly after the commercial's airing. Sandcastle was also put into Madden NFL 13 as a card in the 'Ultimate Team' game mode. For April Fools' Day, 2013, NFL.com reported that Sandcastle would be the Chiefs' first overall selection.
 
The character developed marketing value and continued to appear in headlines, such as a fake endorsement deal with Under Armour and continued to make other appearance at NFL events. Sandcastle also had football trading cards produced and inserted into products by Topps and Panini America.

Other business and entertainment ventures
In addition to his sports career, Sanders also had a career in music as a rapper. He released his debut album in 1994, Prime Time, through Hammer's Bust It Records label via Capitol Records. In 1995, Hammer released "Straight to My Feet" with Sanders, from the Street Fighter soundtrack (released in December 1994). The song charted No. 57 in the UK.

Sanders moved on to other ventures after his retirement. In 2003, Sanders took interest in Devin Hester, a return specialist from Miami. Sanders mentored Hester; he counselled and advised him during his collegiate career. The Chicago Bears drafted Hester in the second round of the 2006 NFL Draft. Since then, Hester has broken the record for the most total returns for touchdowns in NFL history with 15 punt returns and 5 kick off returns. Hester has cited Sanders as one of his major inspirations and idols, and thanked him for his training and advice. Hester, also known as "Anytime", occasionally performs Sanders' signature touchdown dance and high-steps in homage to his mentor.

Sanders also tried to adopt a high school running back, Noel Devine, who was one of the top recruits in 2007. Sanders was advised against doing this but responded, "He doesn't have parents; they died. God put this young man in my heart. This is not about sports. This is about a kid's life." He now mentors Devine, and was a factor in Devine's extended wait to sign a letter-of-intent to West Virginia University. Devine eventually signed to play football for the Mountaineers.
Sanders has also been a mentor to Baltimore Ravens wide receiver Michael Crabtree, as well as former Dallas Cowboys wide receiver, Dez Bryant.

In January 2004, Sanders was hired as an assistant coach to the Dallas Fury, a women's professional basketball team in the National Women's Basketball League, even though Sanders had never played organized basketball either in college or the professional level.

On September 2, 2005, in response to Hurricane Katrina, Sanders challenged all professional athletes in the four major sports to donate $1,000 each to relief efforts, hoping to raise between $1.5 and $3 million. Sanders said "Through unity, we can touch thousands... I have friends and relatives that feel this pain. Help in any way you can."
In April 2006, Sanders became an owner of the Austin Wranglers, an Arena Football League team.

Sanders has occasionally served as a celebrity spokesperson, such as representing Monitronics which is a security system firm, at an industry conference in the spring of 2010.

In 2012, he co-founded Prime Prep Academy, a group of charter schools in Texas. The school was plagued by ethical, legal, and financial issues, and closed on January 30, 2015, due to financial insolvency.

Discography

Personal life
Sanders has been married twice: to Carolyn Chambers (1989–1998), with whom he has two children; and Pilar Biggers-Sanders (1999–2015), with whom he has three children.

Sanders is a Christian. In 1997, Sanders was going through a dark time in his life when his first marriage was ending. "I was going through the trials and tribulations of life. I was pretty much running on fumes. I was empty, no peace, no joy. Losing hope with the progression of everything." He also said that money, sex, and other things did not solve his problems. Sanders attempted suicide by driving his car off of a cliff. However, he survived the 30 to 40 foot drop. Sanders said, "I finally just got on my knees and gave it all to the Lord." He has said, "Sports is sports, it's a game. My faith is everything."

Sanders, along with J. M. Black, published his autobiography, Power, Money & Sex: How Success Almost Ruined My Life (World Publishing, 1998). The book was inspired after he began counseling with Bishop T. D. Jakes. He notes his agent Eugene E. Parker as another person who influenced his life.

Sanders has made an effort to coach at several different stops. His first coaching position in 2012, was with the charter school Prime Prep Academy, which he helped found. Sanders was later fired as the coach after a school staffer alleged Sanders assaulted the staffer. Sanders denied the claim. In 2015, Sanders was named the CEO of FOCUS Academies and granted the head coaching position at the Triple A academy, where Sanders led them to face his alma mater North Fort Myers High School in Florida, a game featuring a key matchup between several ranked recruits. On August 17, 2017, it was announced by CBS Sports that Sanders would be switching coaching positions at a new high school to become the offensive coordinator at Trinity Christian-Cedar Hill high school in Cedar Hill, Texas. The move was significant for Sanders, as both his sons played at the high school. Sanders served on the staff as offensive coordinator under former Dallas Cowboy Aveion Cason.

Sanders' son Shilo played defensive back for South Carolina for two seasons before transferring to Jackson State University in December 2020. A younger son, Shedeur, is a quarterback who was verbally committed to Florida Atlantic, but flipped his commitment to Jackson State. He enrolled at Jackson State in January 2021, redshirting the rescheduled spring 2021 season before winning the starting job that summer. After leading his father's team to its first SWAC title since 2007 in the fall 2021 season, Shedeur was named that season's recipient of the Jerry Rice Award as the top FCS freshman.

In 2020, Sanders graduated from Talladega College with a bachelor's degree in business administration with an emphasis on organizational management.

In 2021, Sanders underwent several foot surgeries and had two toes on his left foot amputated as a result of blood clots.

See also

List of Major League Baseball annual triples leaders
List of athletes who came out of retirement
 List of athletes who played in Major League Baseball and the National Football League

Explanatory notes

References

External links

 
 Jackson State profile
 Deion Sanders at Glorioustalks
 
 

1967 births
Living people
African-American baseball players
African-American coaches of American football
African-American players of American football
Albany-Colonie Yankees players
All-American college football players
American amputees
American football cornerbacks
American football return specialists
American football wide receivers
Arena Football League executives
Atlanta Braves players
Atlanta Falcons players
Baltimore Ravens players
Barstool Sports people
Baseball players from Florida
Chattanooga Lookouts players
Christians from Florida
Cincinnati Reds players
Coaches of American football from Florida
College Football Hall of Fame inductees
Colorado Buffaloes football coaches
Columbus Clippers players
Dallas Cowboys players
Florida State Seminoles baseball players
Florida State Seminoles football players
Florida State Seminoles men's track and field athletes
Fort Lauderdale Yankees players
Gulf Coast Yankees players
High school football coaches in Texas
Jackson State Tigers football coaches
Louisville RiverBats players
Major League Baseball center fielders
Major League Baseball left fielders
National Conference Pro Bowl players
National Football League announcers
National Football League Defensive Player of the Year Award winners
New York Yankees players
Participants in American reality television series
Players of American football from Florida
Pro Football Hall of Fame inductees
San Francisco 49ers players
San Francisco Giants players
Sportspeople from Fort Myers, Florida
Syracuse SkyChiefs players
Washington Redskins players